Hamburg Concerto for solo horn and chamber orchestra with four obbligato natural horns is one of György Ligeti's last works, composed in 1998–99 and revised in 2003.

The work was commissioned by the ZEIT-Foundation, expressing the special wish that it should be associated with the City of Hamburg. It is dedicated to the German horn player Marie Luise Neunecker, who premiered the original six movements with the Asko Ensemble in January 2001 in Hamburg (the place of the premiere being another special wish from the ZEIT-foundation).

The final revision is cast in seven movements:

György Ligeti wrote about his work:

The name was chosen in analogy to Bach's Brandenburg Concertos (Brandenburgische Konzerte), Ligeti saw the naming as a dedication:

Notes

External links
 Study score published by Schott Musik International, Mainz, Germany

Compositions by György Ligeti
Horn concertos
Compositions for chamber orchestra
Music in Hamburg
Commissioned music
Music with dedications